Calcium-transporting ATPase type 2C member 1 is an enzyme that in humans is encoded by the ATP2C1 gene.

This gene encodes one of the SPCA proteins, a Ca2+ ion-transporting P-type ATPase. This magnesium-dependent enzyme catalyzes the hydrolysis of ATP coupled with the transport of the calcium. Defects in this gene cause Hailey-Hailey disease, an autosomal dominant disorder. Alternatively spliced transcript variants encoding different isoforms have been identified.

References

External links

Further reading